That '70s Show is an American comedy television series that originally aired on Fox for 200 episodes and four specials across eight seasons, from August 23, 1998, to May 18, 2006. The series spans the years 1976 through the end of 1979.

Series screenwriters included Philip Stark, Mark Hudis, Jeff and Jackie Filgo, Will Forte, Gregg Mettler, Dean Batali, and series creators Bonnie and Terry Turner. All episodes following the pilot were directed by David Trainer. For seasons 5–8, episodes were titled after song names from various 1970s British rock bands: fifth-season episodes are named after songs by Led Zeppelin, sixth season titles are The Who songs, all seventh season titles are from The Rolling Stones and, except for the finale, eighth season titles are Queen songs.

The entire series of 200 episodes has been released on Regions 1, 2 and 4 DVD, and in 2015, the series was released on Blu-ray.

Series overview

Episodes

Season 1 (1998–99)

Season 2 (1999–2000)

Season 3 (2000–01)

Season 4 (2001–02)

Season 5 (2002–03)

Season 6 (2003–04)

Season 7 (2004–05)

Season 8 (2005–06)

Specials

Ratings

Notes

References

External links 
 

Lists of American sitcom episodes
Lists of American teen comedy television series episodes
That '70s Show